Solym is a rural locality (a settlement) in Svetlichanskoye Rural Settlement, Kosinsky District, Perm Krai, Russia. The population was 187 as of 2010. There are 3 streets.

Geography 
Solym is located 30 km north of Kosa (the district's administrative centre) by road. Ust-Kosa is the nearest rural locality.

References 

Rural localities in Kosinsky District